Fourth of July Peak can refer to the following mountains in the United States:

 Fourth of July Peak (California) in Alpine County
 Fourth of July Peak (Bonneville County, Idaho)
 Fourth of July Peak (Custer County, Idaho)
 Fourth of July Peak (Washington) in Pend Oreille County

References